The Willmar 8 were eight female employees of the Citizens National Bank in Willmar, Minnesota, USA who went on strike on December 16, 1977 over charges of sex discrimination. The tellers and bookkeepers were protesting unequal pay and unequal opportunities for advancement. The women were Doris Boshart, Irene Wallin, Sylvia Erickson Koll, Jane Harguth Groothuis, Sandi Treml, Teren Novotny, Shirley Solyntjes, and Glennis Ter Wisscha. They set up a picket line outside the bank when the wind chill was -70°F (-57 °C).  One other employee, Lois Johnson, quit just before the strike began. 

"The women's strike caused stress for many in the Western Minnesota town of 14,000 people. Few outwardly showed support for the strike and the lawyer who took the women's case, John Mack, lost his position as county chair of the Republican Party." From outside Willmar, women's and labor groups as well as private individuals supported the strike in various ways.

In the summer of 1979, E. Dorian Gadsden of the National Labor Relations Board issued a ruling on the complaint. The NLRB declared that the bank was guilty of unfair labor practices, but those practices did not cause the strike. The NLRB ruled that the strike was "economic". As a result there was no back pay and no guarantee of the women recovering their jobs.

Rhoda R. Gilman, the author of The Story of Minnesota's Past observed that "across Minnesota and elsewhere, banks quietly began to make some changes." In 1981 Lee Grant directed a documentary on the Willmar 8 entitled The Willmar 8. A 1984 docudrama, A Matter of Sex, also directed by Lee Grant, was based on events related to the strike.

References

External links

Willmar 8 in MNopedia, the Minnesota Encyclopedia 

Labor disputes in the United States
1977 labor disputes and strikes
Willmar, Minnesota
1977 in Minnesota
Labor disputes in Minnesota
1977 in women's history
December 1977 events in the United States
Quantified groups of defendants